Memecylon candidum is a species of plant in the family Melastomataceae. It is found in Cameroon and Nigeria. It is threatened by habitat loss.

References

candidum
Vulnerable plants
Taxonomy articles created by Polbot